XHPYM-FM is a radio station on 103.1 FM in Mérida, Yucatán. It is owned by Cadena RASA and is known as Los 40 format.

History
XEPY-AM 1450 received its concession on July 27, 1961. It was a 250-watt station, raising power to 1,000 watts in the 1980s and later moving to 680 kHz with 2,500 watts day.

It migrated to FM after being authorized in 2010. Its call sign was changed to XHPYM-FM with an added M for Mérida.

On January 1, 2023, Cadena RASA moved the Los 40 format and on-air staff from XHUL-FM 96.9 to XHPYM-FM, displacing its existing "Retro FM" classic hits format, and leased XHUL-FM to El Heraldo Radio.

References

Radio stations in Yucatán
Radio stations established in 1961
1961 establishments in Mexico